Eucalyptus drummondii, commonly known as Drummond's gum or Drummond's mallee, is a species of mallee or tree that is endemic to the southwest of Western Australia. It has smooth bark, narrow elliptical to egg-shaped adult leaves, flower buds in groups of seven, white flowers and hemispherical fruit.

Description
It has smooth, powdery bark that is white, pink or grey in colour. Flowering mainly occurs from September to December and the flowers are white.

Taxonomy
Eucalyptus drummondii was first formally described in 1867 by George Bentham in his book Flora Australiensis. Bentham based the species on a specimen collected "between Swan River and King George's Sound" by James Drummond. The specific epithet (drummondii) honours Drummond.

Distribution and habitat
Drummond's mallee grows in hilly country in soils derived from laterite, sometimes over granite and is found between Eneabba, Wongan Hills, Bridgetown and Woodanilling in the Avon Wheatbelt, Geraldton Sandplains, Jarrah Forest, Swan Coastal Plain and Warren biogeographic regions.

Conservation status
Eucalyptus drummondii is classified as "not threatened" by the Western Australian Government Department of Parks and Wildlife

See also
List of Eucalyptus species

References

drummondii
Myrtales of Australia
Eucalypts of Western Australia
Trees of Australia
Mallees (habit)
Plants described in 1867
Taxa named by George Bentham